Dive is a two-part British television drama starring Jack O'Connell, Aisling Loftus and Gina McKee. Broadcast on BBC Two in July 2010, the show dealt with the problems of teenage relationships and pregnancy against the backdrop of a young diver's preparations for the 2012 Summer Olympics.

Critical reception
The Independent reviewer called Dive "a pitch-perfect depiction of young, modern, British puppy love." The Daily Telegraph said it was "a rather beautiful and moving piece of television. Writer/director Dominic Savage... has made a fine, truthful film, several cuts above your average telly drama", a "profoundly engaging" love story with "superb performances" by Jack O’Connell and  Aisling Loftus.

The Observer felt the "intensely memorable film was slow-build, like a dive itself. You had long, graceful shots of wind-farms and playgrounds and parks and naughty smokers, of modern life in a seaside town, with some beautiful music to let you think, to wonder what was going to happen.... And then, in the film as in the pool, the explosion, and the splash." Jack O’Connell's performance was "mesmerising, comedic, soulful" and Aisling Loftus "is going to be a phenomenon."

References

External links
 
 

2010 British television series debuts
BBC television dramas